Sir Allan Macgregor Smith   (19 May 1871 – 21 February 1941) was a British solicitor, businessman, and Conservative Party politician. He was the MP for Croydon South 1919–1923.

Smith was born in Glasgow, the second of eight children. Educated at Glasgow University, he qualified as a solicitor, and during the First World War, successfully negotiated labour with trade unions to successfully meet munitions supply.

He was made a Knight Commander of the Order of the British Empire in the 1918 Birthday Honours.

References

External links 

1871 births
1941 deaths
Conservative Party (UK) MPs for English constituencies
UK MPs 1918–1922
UK MPs 1922–1923
Knights Commander of the Order of the British Empire
Politicians from Glasgow
Alumni of the University of Glasgow
Scottish solicitors